Oreta sublustris is a moth in the family Drepanidae. It was described by William Warren in 1923. It is found in New Guinea, where it is known from Papua.

References

Moths described in 1923
Drepaninae